The Anglo-Dutch Gold Coast Treaty of 1867 redistributed forts along the Dutch and British Gold Coasts in order to concentrate the parties' areas of influence.  All forts to the east of Fort Elmina were adopted by Britain, and all forts to the west by the Netherlands.

History

Whereas the Dutch forts on the Gold Coast were a colonial backwater in the 19th century, the British forts were slowly developed into a full colony, especially after Britain took over the Danish Gold Coast in 1850. The presence of Dutch forts in an area that became increasingly influenced by the United Kingdom was deemed undesirable, and in the late 1850s British began pressing for either a buyout of the Dutch forts, or a trade of forts so as to produce more coherent areas of influence.

In the Dutch political landscape of the time, a buyout was not a possibility, so a trade of forts was negotiated. In 1867, the "Convention between Great Britain and the Netherlands for an Interchange of Territory on the Gold Coast of Africa" was signed, in which all Dutch forts to the east of Elmina were handed over to Britain, while the British forts west of Elmina were handed over to the Netherlands.

The trade proved a disaster for the Dutch, as their long-standing alliance with the Ashanti was not well received by the population around the new forts assigned to them. The people of British Komenda refused to hoist the Dutch flag and eventually resorted in taking Dutch naval officers hostage who tried to force their hand. The Dutch responded by sending a punitive expedition to Komenda in 1869–70. Meanwhile, the Fante Confederacy had laid siege to Elmina. In this context, the Dutch colonial minister secretly began negotiating a handover of all Dutch forts to Britain. With the Gold Coast Treaty of 1871, the whole colony was ceded to the United Kingdom for 46,939.62 Dutch guilders.

Tariffs
One of the principal reasons for the trade of forts was that a coherent area of influence would allow the collection of customs duties on the Gold Coast. The United Kingdom and the Netherlands committed themselves, by virtue of article 2 of the treaty, to the following tariffs on the Gold Coast:

Signatories
For the Netherlands:
 , Dutch envoy in London;
 Cornelis Nagtglas, ex-governor of the Dutch Gold Coast.

For the United Kingdom:
 Henry Herbert, 4th Earl of Carnarvon, Secretary of State for the Colonies;
 Edward Stanley, 15th Earl of Derby, Secretary of State for Foreign Affairs.

Forts traded

From the Netherlands to the United Kingdom

From the United Kingdom to the Netherlands

See also
 Anglo-Dutch Treaty of 1814
 Anglo-Dutch Treaty of 1824
 Anglo-Dutch Treaties of 1870–71
 Netherlands–United Kingdom relations

Notes

References
 
 
 
 

1867 in the United Kingdom
1867 in the Netherlands
History of Ghana
Treaties of the United Kingdom (1801–1922)
Netherlands–United Kingdom treaties
19th century in the Netherlands
1867 treaties
Treaties of the Netherlands
Dutch Gold Coast
Treaties extended to the Gold Coast (British colony)
1867 in British law